Alberto Collo (6 May 1883 – 7 May 1955) was an Italian actor who appeared in more than a hundred and thirty films during his career, mostly during the silent era. During the 1910s he starred in several films directed by Baldassarre Negroni.

Selected filmography
 Broken Idol (1913)
 The Lady of the Camellias (1915)
 The Shadow of Her Past (1915)
 Tortured Soul (1919)
 Saetta Learns to Live (1924)
 Maciste's American Nephew (1924)
 Pleasure Train (1924)
 Maciste in the Lion's Cage (1926)
 Villafranca (1934)
 Shipwrecked (1939)
 William Tell (1949)
 The Crossroads (1951)

References

Bibliography 
 Moliterno, Gino. Historical Dictionary of Italian Cinema. Scarecrow Press, 2008.

External links 
 

1883 births
1955 deaths
Italian male film actors
Italian male silent film actors
Actors from Turin
20th-century Italian male actors